Noeeta strigilata is a species of tephritid or fruit flies in the genus Noeeta of the family Tephritidae.

Distribution
Greece.

References

Tephritinae
Insects described in 1855
Diptera of Europe